The 2010–11 Elitserien season was Frölunda HC's 31st season in Elitserien. The regular season started on September 17, 2010 away against Timrå IK and ended on March 5, 2011 away against Luleå HF.

The 2010–11 season was Frölunda's worst season in four years. For the first time since 2007, Frölunda finished 9th in the regular season and thus missed the following playoffs. With just a few rounds of the regular season left, Frölunda were expected by many hockey experts to finish 11th or 12th in the regular season and thus be forced to play in Kvalserien. However, Frölunda won the last three games and thus stayed in Elitserien without having to play in Kvalserien.

Pre-season
On April 13 it was reported that Ulf Dahlén, who had one year left on his contract, was relieved of his duties as head coach. The decision was officially announced the following day. Dahlén was offered to continue working as part of the coaching staff as an assistant coach, but declined the offer. Kent Johansson was announced as new head coach on April 21. In May Stephan Lundh, who joined the coaching staff in late January 2010 to aid Dahlén, signed a one-year contract to work as an assistant coach to Johansson.

European Trophy

Exhibition games

Regular season

Standings

Games log

Statistics

Skaters

Transactions
The off-season started with the departure of Janne Niskala—who decided to pursue offers from the Kontinental Hockey League (KHL)—and Joakim Andersson, who signed a three-year entry level contract with the Detroit Red Wings. Concurrently the club announced that Jens Karlsson and Martin Røymark were not offered new contracts, and that Mikael Johansson had signed a two-year contract extension. The following week Nicklas Lasu signed a one-year extension with Frölunda, and Patric Blomdahl decided to leave Frölunda to reunite with his junior club AIK which had been promoted back to Elitserien. In May Niklas Andersson decided to sign a one-year contract extension to play his fourteenth season for Frölunda, and goaltender Joakim Lundström was signed to a one-year contract. Later that month the club announced that Oscar Hedman had signed a one-year contract extension, and that Toni Koivisto, Mikko Mäenpää, and William Wallén had all signed two-year contracts with the club. Carl Klingberg and Peter Andersson signed entry-level contracts with the Atlanta Thrashers and Vancouver Canucks respectively, both with the intention of playing for Frölunda on a loan during the 2010–11 season. Prior to the June 15 deadline for NHL teams to sign contracted Elitserien players Frölunda had to say goodbye to their second and third best scorers from the 2009–10 season; Fredrik Pettersson and Mathis Olimb, who decided to try their luck in North America, Pettersson with the Atlanta Thrashers and Olimb with the Chicago Blackhawks. In late July Mika Pyörälä signed a three-year contract with Frölunda.

Drafted players

Frölunda HC players picked in the 2011 NHL Entry Draft at the Xcel Energy Center in St. Paul, Minnesota.

References

External links
Frolundaindians.com — Official team website
Hockeyligan.se — Official league website
Swehockey.se — Official statistics website

2010-11
2010–11 Elitserien season